Tommy Mortensen (born 4 January 1966) is a Danish judoka. He competed in the men's half-lightweight event at the 1988 Summer Olympics.

References

1966 births
Living people
People from Simrishamn Municipality
Danish male judoka
Olympic judoka of Denmark
Judoka at the 1988 Summer Olympics